Alnwick is a surname. Notable people with the surname include:

Ben Alnwick (born 1987), English footballer
Jak Alnwick (born 1993), English footballer
Robert Alnwick, English politician
William Alnwick (died 1449), English Catholic clergyman

English toponymic surnames